Central Ward is a Brisbane City Council ward covering the CBD, Fortitude Valley, New Farm, Spring Hill, Herston, Bowen Hills, Newstead and Teneriffe. The current councillor is Vicki Howard of the Liberal National Party, who gained the ward from Labor at the 2012 election.

History
Labor's David Hinchliffe won Central in 1988. For most of his tenure, Central was considered a safe Labor seat, until the party's vote began to decline from the 2004 election onwards. David Hinchliffe retired in 2012 and the election held that year was won by LNP candidate Vicki Howard.

Results

2020

2016

2012

References

City of Brisbane wards